Zaratha prosarista is a moth of the family Agonoxenidae. It is found in India (Assam).

References

Moths described in 1909
Zaratha
Moths of Asia